Unión Balompédica Conquense is a Spanish football team based in Cuenca, in the autonomous community of Castile-La Mancha. Founded in 1946 it currently plays in Segunda División B – Group 3, holding home games at Estadio La Fuensanta, with a 6,000-seat capacity.

History
In the 2018–19 season the club was relegated to Tercera División by finishing 18th in the Segunda División B, Group 3. Conquense had only 3 away victories and total 15 losses (4th worst result in the league) in that season. In June 2019 Nacho Alfonso was appointed head coach of the club. With him the club had a good start of the season, being just 4 points behind the leader after the first 15 matches.

Season to season

18 seasons in Segunda División B
38 seasons in Tercera División
17 seasons in Categorías Regionales

Honours
Tercera División: 2006–07, 2015–16, 2017–18

Current squad

Famous players

References

External links
Official website 
Futbolme team profile 

 
Football clubs in Castilla–La Mancha
Association football clubs established in 1946
1946 establishments in Spain
Sport in Cuenca, Spain